Undercover is a 1983 Australian film directed by David Stevens. Michael Pare, Geneviève Picot, Peter Phelps, Barry Otto, Nicholas Eadie and Sandy Gore star in the film.

Production 
It was based on an original idea by Miranda Downes, who wanted to make a film based on Australian underwear manufacturer Fred Burley. Stevens was attracted to the film because it gave him the chance to make a film that was fun and glamorous, which said something about Australia.

The investors insisted on an American actor in the cast. Dennis Quaid was originally meant to play the American lead but his involvement was objected to by Actors Equity. Equity also did not like Stevens' second choice for the role but approved his third, Pare.

References

External links

Undercover at Oz Movies

Australian comedy films
1983 films
Films scored by Bruce Smeaton
1980s English-language films
1980s Australian films